Tim Rieser is a senior foreign policy aid to Senator Patrick Leahy. He is one "of the most powerful staffers in Congress presiding over U.S. foreign policy and U.S. foreign assistance."

In 2015 he was listed as number 22 of Politico 50 - a "guide to the thinkers, doers and visionaries transforming American politics".

Education
Rieser graduated from Dartmouth College in 1976 and from Antioch School of Law, now the University of the District of Columbia David A. Clarke School of Law, in 1979.

Political career
Rieser is a former public defender from Vermont.  He has worked for Leahy since 1985.  Since 1989 he has served as the Democratic Clerk for the Appropriations Subcommittee on State and Foreign Operations.

Rieser was one of the architects of the 1992 law that banned land mines.

Rieser also helped draft the 1998 Leahy Law which bans the United States from providing military assistance to foreign armies that violate human rights without being held to account.  In 2014, Guatemalan President Otto Pérez  made international news by attacking Rieser publicly for aid restrictions.

Rieser was influential in opening U.S. policy toward Cuba and played a "significant role" in getting USAID contractor Alan Gross released from prison in Cuba.

References

External links
 Timothy S Rieser Professional Staff, Senate Committee on Appropriations

21st-century American lawyers
Legislative staff
Living people
United States congressional aides
Vermont Democrats
Year of birth missing (living people)